The International Food Policy Research Institute (IFPRI) is an international agricultural research center founded in the early 1970s to improve the understanding of national agricultural and food policies to promote the adoption of innovations in agricultural technology. Additionally, IFPRI was meant to shed more light on the role of agricultural and rural development in the broader development pathway of a country. The mission of IFPRI is to provide research-based policy solutions that sustainably reduce poverty and end hunger and malnutrition.

IFPRI carries out food policy research and disseminates it through hundreds of publications, bulletins, conferences, and other initiatives. IFPRI was organized as a District of Columbia non-profit, non-stock corporation on March 5, 1975, and its first research bulletin was produced in February 1976. IFPRI has offices in several developing countries, including China, Ethiopia, and India, and has research staff working in many more countries around the world. Most of the research takes place in developing countries in Central America, South America, Africa, and Asia.

IFPRI is part of a network of international research institutes funded in part by the CGIAR, which in turn is funded by governments, private businesses and foundations, and the World Bank.

Scope
IFPRI's institutional strategy rests on three pillars: research, capacity strengthening, and policy communication.

Research areas
Research topics have included low crop and animal productivity, and environmental degradation, water management, fragile lands, property rights, collective action, sustainable intensification of agricultural production, the impact of climate change on poor farmers, the problems and opportunities of biotechnology, food security, micronutrient malnutrition, microfinance programs, urban food security, resource allocation within households, and school feeding in low-income countries.

Gender and development
One major area of research is gender and development, One study, conducted in Sub-Saharan Africa, looked at the relative productivity of plots of farm land controlled by men compared to plots controlled by women. They found that the majority of resources are devoted to plots controlled by men, but if resources were diverted to plots controlled by women productivity could increase by as much as 20%. In another study in Kenya, where women get almost no education, they determined that if women farmers were provided one year of primary education, maize production could increase by as much as 24%.

Studies conducted in Egypt and Mozambique found that the education level of adult females in a household is more important than the education level of adult males to bring a household out of poverty. Increasing the education of mothers to completion of primary school decreased the percentage of households below the poverty line by 33.7%. Related studies in Bangladesh, Ethiopia, Indonesia and South Africa found that when women controlled the finances children benefited. The funds were more likely to be spent on children's clothes, education and general well-being for both girls and boys.

Climate change
One of the areas of research for the IFPRI is the effects of climate change on developing countries.

In 2011, IFPRI published the results of a study in The Republic of Yemen predicting the economic outcome of climate change in urban and rural Yemeni communities. The study predicted that the country's GDP would drop, but that agricultural GDP would increase. It predicted that flooding would cause farmers to lose some crops, but agriculture in general would benefit. The group expected to suffer the most would be rural non-farmers. In the long term, climate change was predicted to damage food security and cause a decrease in household GDP.

In December 2011, the IFPRI published a report sent to the United Nations Framework Convention on Climate Change (UNFCCC) highlighting the need for research into agricultural systems likely to be affected by climate change. They highlighted 12 that they suggested should be high research priority:

Malnutrition
IFPRI has done extensive research into areas related to malnutrition. They have conducted research all over the world on various issues that arise from or cause malnutrition. They have looked at HIV and Malaria and how malnutrition affects the epidemiology of these diseases. They have looked at the effects of childhood malnutrition on adult health. They have looked at the potential benefits of biotech crops on childhood nutrition, and the effects of vitamin supplements in general.

A study in Ethiopia to test cost effectiveness of two different methods of treating malnutrition in children was done by Tekeste Asayehegn. In the study the compared two different methods of long-term care for the malnourished children. In the first method children were brought to Therapeutic Feeding Centers where they remained as in-patients. The alternative method involved the supplies to treat malnourished children being sent to local clinics and healthcare facilities where the children were brought on a weekly or fortnight basis for treatment. The nutritional supplements were then sent home with the children. Volunteers checked on the patients at home and brought them to the facilities for treatment. This localized treatment program was found to cut the cost of treating a malnourished child in half.

In Uganda the IFPRI conducted a study on the relationship between malnutrition and the incidences of malaria. There were two variables in the study the first was evidence of malnutrition in the child and the second was whether or not the child was infected with HIV. The study indicated that there may be a correlation between malnutrition and increased risk of malaria. Both the HIV-negative and positive patients that were malnourished showed higher rates of malaria than the groups with better nutrition.

Transgenic crops
IFPRI neither supports nor opposes genetically modified foods; however, they have released many publications on the potential impact of using transgenic crops. There are many types of transgenic crops. Some modify the plant's ability to produce natural pesticides while others affect the nutritional value of the crops themselves. In 2009 IFPRI released a publication that was an overview of the use of biotech crops between 1997 and 2007. Since the institute maintains a neutral standpoint on the subject, they chose the term "biotech" as being less inflammatory than "genetically modified" or "transgenic". The publication was a review of many studies conducted during the ten-year time period in several countries around the world.

They observed that many of the studies were inconclusive in terms of the economic value of a crop. For instance, the studies showed conclusively that the use of Bt cotton reduced the need for pesticide treatment and increased crop yield, but they did not show whether it increased profits for the small farms involved. They determined that the information provided to the consumer was important in these studies. Negative messages were very effective at dissuading use.

Overall, the researchers determined that some strains of biotech crops were economically promising especially in countries like India and China. They were unwilling to make too strong a judgment on the data provided recommending better studies be conducted over the following ten years to obtain a more complete understanding of the economic effects of biotech crops in developing countries. This publication made no observations about potential environmental or health related issues involved with the crops. It simply dealt with potential profits and economic impact.

IFPRI also analyzes agricultural market reforms, trade policy, World Trade Organization negotiations in the context of agriculture, institutional effectiveness, crop and income diversification, postharvest activity, and agroindustry.

The institute is involved in measuring the Millennium Development Goals project and supports governments in the formulation and implementation of development strategies.

Further work includes research on agricultural innovation systems and the role of capacity strengthening in agricultural development.

Products and publications
IFPRI targets its policy and research products to many audiences, including developing-country policymakers, nongovernmental organizations (NGOs), and civil-society organizations, "opinion leaders", donors, advisers, and media.

Publications by IFPRI include books, research reports, but also newsletters, briefs, and fact sheets, which are also available from IFPRI's Knowledge Repository. It is also involved in the collection of primary data and the compilation and processing of secondary data.

The Global Food Policy Report is one of IFPRI's flagship publications. To meet the needs of policy makers and researchers interested in food security and nutrition, this annual report offers an overview of recent food policy developments that have contributed to or hindered progress in reducing hunger and improving nutrition. It reviews what happened in food policy and why, examines key challenges and opportunities, shares new evidence and knowledge, updates key food policy indicators, and highlights emerging issues. The 2017 Report takes an in-depth look at how rapid urbanization is reshaping food systems and its impact on food security and nutrition for rural and urban populations, focusing on policies to improve rural-urban linkages.

In 1993 IFPRI introduced the 2020 Vision Initiative, which aims at coordinating and supporting a debate among national governments, nongovernmental organizations, the private sector, international development institutions, and other elements of civil society to reach food security for all by 2020.

As of 2006 IFPRI produces the Global Hunger Index (GHI) yearly measuring the progress and failure of individual countries and regions in the fight against hunger. The GHI is a collaboration of IFPRI, the Welthungerhilfe, and Concern Worldwide.

IFPRI has produced the related Hunger Index for the States of India (ISHI) (2008) and the Sub-National Hunger Index for Ethiopia (2009).

Organizational structure
IFPRI is made up of the Office of the Director General, Eastern and Southern Africa Office, South Asia Office, West & Central Africa Office, Communications & Knowledge Management Division, the Finance and Administration Division, and 5 research divisions:
Development Strategy and Governance
Environment and Production Technology
Markets, Trade, and Institutions
Poverty, Health, and Nutrition
Communications & Knowledge Management
Finance and Administration
Partnership, Impact and Capacity Strengthening

Directors-General 

Johan Swinnen (2020–Present)
Shenggen Fan (2009–2020)
Joachim von Braun (2002–2009)
Per Pinstrup-Andersen (1992–2002)
Just Faaland (interim DG, 1990–1992)
John Williams Mellor (1977–1990)
Dale E. Hathaway (1975–1977, founding director general)

IFPRI also leads two of CGIAR's Research Programs (CRPs): 'Policies, Institutions, and Markets' (PIM) and 'Agriculture for Nutrition and Health' (A4NH).

Research Networks 
IFPRI hosts several research networks:
The Agricultural Science and Technology Indicators (ASTI)
The CGIAR Systemwide Program on Collective Action and Property Rights (CAPRi)
Harvest Plus
HarvestChoice
AGRODEP
ReSAKSS

Impact
The evaluation of policy-oriented research poses a lot of challenges including the difficulty to quantify the impact of knowledge and ideas in terms of reduced poverty and or increased income or the attribution of a change in these numbers to a specific study or research project.

Despite these challenges, studies find that IFPRI research had spill-over effects for specific country-level research, but also in setting the global policy agenda, for example in the areas biodiversity (influencing the International Treaty on Plant Genetic Resources) and trade (with respect to the Doha Development Round of trade negotiations).

Another example of IFPRI's impact on policy formulation was the 2007–2008 world food price crisis. IFPRI was able to quickly pull together relevant research and its resulting recommendations were included in the United Nations' Comprehensive Framework for Action on food security.

IFPRI leads a number of partnerships that engage different stakeholders to influence policies with an impact on poverty, hunger and food situation of poor people. The newest of these initiatives is Compact2025, a partnership that develops and disseminates evidence-based advice to politicians and other decision-makers aimed at ending hunger and undernutrition in the coming 10 years.

Criticism
CGIAR and its agencies, including IFPRI, have been criticized for their connections to Chinese government, Pakistani expats and multinational agribusiness. Its research publications have also been cited by critics of genetically modified organisms in agriculture. IFPRI describes itself as "neither an advocate nor an opponent of genetically modified crops". In addition, many sources recognize CGIAR as having support of smallholders and poor farmers central to its mission.

References

Further reading
Global Food Policy Report
Adato, Michelle, and Ruth Meinzen-Dick. 2007. Agricultural Research, Livelihoods, and Poverty: Studies of Economic and Social Impacts in Six Countries. Johns Hopkins University Press, Baltimore, MD.
CGIAR Science Council Secretariat. 2006. "Fourth External Program and Management Review of the International Food Policy Research Institute (IFPRI)". Rome, Italy: CGIAR Science Council.
Farrar, Curtis. 2000. "The first ten years of IFPRI". Washington, D.C.: IFPRI.
Lele, Uma J. 2004. Policy Research in the CGIAR. In The CGIAR at 31: An Independent Meta-Evaluation of the Consultative Group on International Agricultural Research, Chapter 11, pp. 87–92. Washington, D.C.: The World Bank.
Renkow, Mitch, and Derek Byerlee. 2010. "The impacts of CGIAR research: A review of recent evidence". Food Policy, In Press, Corrected Proof. Available online May 20, 2010.
von Braun, Joachim and Rajul Pandya-Lorch, Rajul, eds. 2005. Food policy for the poor: Expanding the research frontiers, highlights from 30 years of IFPRI research. Washington, D.C.: IFPRI.

External links

Organizations established in 1975
International research institutes
Agricultural research institutes in the United States
Food science institutes
Food politics
Agrarian politics
Research institutes in Washington, D.C.